Bandar-e Emam Khomeyni District is a district (bakhsh) in Mahshahr County, Khuzestan Province, Iran. At the 2006 census, its population was 68,000, in 14,878 families.  The District has one city: Bandar-e Emam Khomeyni. The District has one rural district (dehestan): Bandar-e Emam Khomeyni Rural District.

References 

Mahshahr County
Districts of Khuzestan Province